Charles Molloy may refer to:
 Charles Molloy (journalist) (died 1767), Irish journalist, political activist and minor playwright
 Charles Molloy (lawyer) (1640–1690), Irish lawyer known as a writer on maritime law